Zygonychidium gracile is a species of dragonfly in the family Libellulidae. It is the only species in its genus.

Z. gracile has only been found on a section of the Bandama River in Côte d'Ivoire. It has extremely long cerci (rear appendages) hence its common name of streamertail.

References

Libellulidae
Insects described in 1970